= Rochester Alternative Learning Center =

American special secondary education unit in Minnesota

Coordinates: 43°58′22″N 92°27′41″W

The Rochester Alternative Learning Center caters to secondary school students with a range of learning difficulties in Rochester, Minnesota, United States.
